The fourth and final round (also known as Hexagonal or Hex) of CONCACAF's process of 1998 FIFA World Cup qualification was played throughout 1997, from 2 March to 16 November. It was the first Hexagonal final round in CONCACAF's history.

Mexico, the United States, and Jamaica qualified to the 1998 FIFA World Cup. Costa Rica, El Salvador, and Canada were eliminated.

Format
A total of six teams which had advanced from the third round (the three group winners and the three group runners-up) played against each other in a double round-robin format in a single group. The top three teams in the group qualified to the 1998 FIFA World Cup. This round, known as Hexagonal, is the first used by CONCACAF to determine its qualified teams to a FIFA World Cup and was used through the 2018 World Cup qualifying cycle.

Qualified teams

Standings

Matches

Goalscorers

References

4
1997 in CONCACAF football
1996–97 in Mexican football
1997–98 in Mexican football
1996–97 in Jamaican football
1996–97 in Costa Rican football
1997–98 in Costa Rican football
1996–97 in Salvadoran football
1997–98 in Salvadoran football
1997 in American soccer
1997 in Canadian soccer
Q2
Q2
Q2